Thumbs is a mixtape by American rapper Busdriver. It was released by Temporary Whatever on November 6, 2015. A music video was created for "Much".

Production
Thumbs is produced by the likes of Mono/Poly, Fumitake Tamura, Kenny Segal, Caural, and Jeremiah Jae. It includes guest appearances from Hemlock Ernst, Milo, and Anderson .Paak, among others.

Critical reception

Kyle Mullin of Exclaim! commented that Thumbs has "many enthralling surprises, all of which will allow indie rap fans to rest easy knowing that Busdriver has by no means exhausted his waking nightmare, subconsciously subversive shtick." Blake Gillespie of Impose included it on the "Best Rap Mixtapes, EPs, and Free Albums of 2015" list.

Track listing

References

External links
 Thumbs at Bandcamp
 

2015 mixtape albums
Busdriver albums
Albums produced by Mono/Poly
Albums produced by Kenny Segal